Cymatia coleoptrata is a species of water boatman in the family Corixidae in the order Hemiptera.

References

Corixidae
Insects described in 1777